Edgar W. "Butch" Brandau (December 27, 1899 – March 19, 1987), sometimes erroneously listed as Arthur Frank Brandau, was an American football player who played one season in the National Football League with the Detroit Tigers.  He appeared in four games for the Tigers during the 1921 season.  In 1922, he played for the Kenyons, a semi-pro football team in Detroit.  In the opening game of the 1922 season, he scored the only touchdown on a 45-yard punt return.

While attending Eastern High School in Detroit, Brandau gained acclaim both in football and swimming.  In November 1917, the Detroit Free Press noted that he "tore off several twisting runs through a broken field, once getting away for a pretty sprint of over 40 yards."  He also gained acclaim as a leading distance swimmer who attended national meets.

References

1897 births
1973 deaths
Players of American football from Detroit
Detroit Tigers (NFL) players